Barbora Růžičková (born 20 April 1998) is a Czech footballer who plays as a goalkeeper for 1. FC Slovácko and has appeared for the Czech Republic women's national team.

Career
Růžičková has been capped for the Czech Republic national team, appearing for the team during the UEFA Women's Euro 2021 qualifying cycle.

References

External links
 
 
 

1998 births
Living people
Czech women's footballers
Czech Republic women's international footballers
Women's association football goalkeepers
1. FC Slovácko (women) players
Czech Women's First League players